Harpal Singh (born 15 September 1981) is an English former professional footballer. During his career he played for various clubs including Leeds United, Stockport County, Sligo Rovers, Bohemians and Dundalk.

Career
Singh was born in Bradford, England. Although he started out with Leeds United, He made his professional debut when he went to play for Bury at Wrexham during his loan spell for Bury. He also played for Bristol City and Bradford City and twice more at Bury all on loan, before he moved to Stockport County in 2005. Singh's favourite position is left winger. In 2006, he was released by County manager Jim Gannon to sign for Sligo Rovers. He scored once for Stockport, in a 4–2 win over Northampton.

In January 2007, Singh signed for Bohemians but spent the majority of his time at Dalymount Park on the sidelines with injury. He did score against Rhyl F.C. in the 2008 UEFA Intertoto Cup. However, after being a bit-part player in Bohs' Double winning season of 2008, he was released by the club when his contract expired in December 2008. In January 2009, he linked up with his former manager Sean Connor to join newly promoted Dundalk and signed a 6-month contract and was released after his contract was up.

See also
 British Asians in association football

References

External links
 

1981 births
Living people
English Sikhs
English footballers
English people of Punjabi descent
British sportspeople of Indian descent
British Asian footballers
Leeds United F.C. players 79 appearances 
Bury F.C. players
Bristol City F.C. players
Bradford City A.F.C. players
Stockport County F.C. players
Sligo Rovers F.C. players
Bohemian F.C. players
Dundalk F.C. players
English Football League players
League of Ireland players
Association football midfielders
Footballers from Bradford
Expatriate association footballers in the Republic of Ireland